The 1991 Cappagh killings was a gun attack by the loyalist Ulster Volunteer Force (UVF) on 3 March 1991 in the village of Cappagh, County Tyrone, Northern Ireland. A unit of the UVF's Mid-Ulster Brigade drove to the staunchly republican village and shot dead three Provisional IRA members and a Catholic civilian at Boyle's Bar.

Although nobody was ever charged in connection with the killings, it was widely believed by nationalists and much of the press that the attack had been planned and led by Billy Wright, the leader of the Mid-Ulster Brigade's Portadown unit. Wright himself took credit for this and boasted to the Guardian newspaper, "I would look back and say Cappagh was probably our best", though some sources are skeptical about his claim.

There were allegations of collusion between the UVF and the Ulster Defence Regiment (UDR) in the shootings.

The shootings
On the evening of Sunday 3 March 1991, a unit of the Ulster Volunteer Force's Mid-Ulster Brigade drove into the heartland of the East Tyrone IRA, intent on wiping out an entire IRA unit that was based in the County Tyrone village of Cappagh. One team of the UVF men waited outside Boyle's Bar, whilst a second team waited on the outskirts of the town. At 10.30 p.m. when a car pulled-up in the carpark outside the bar, the UVF gunmen opened fire with vz. 58 assault rifles, killing Provisional IRA volunteers John Quinn (23), Dwayne O'Donnell (17) and Malcolm Nugent (20). The victims and car were riddled with bullets. According to author Thomas G. Mitchell, Quinn, O’Donnell and Nugent were part of an IRA Active Service Unit (ASU). The gunmen then attempted to enter the pub but were unable to after the civilians inside realised what was happening and barricaded the door. Unable to get into the bar, a UVF gunman shot through a high open toilet window killing local civilian, Thomas Armstrong (50) and badly wounding a 21-year-old man. Their intended target, IRA commander Brian Arthurs, escaped with his life by crouching behind the bar during the shooting. According to the Conflict Archive on the Internet (CAIN), the three IRA volunteers had only chosen to go to the pub "on the spur of the moment", thus they were unlikely to have been the UVF's original target.

After the attack, the UVF issued a statement: "This was not a sectarian attack on the Catholic community, but was an operation directed at the very roots of the Provisional IRA command structure in the Armagh–Tyrone area". The statement concluded with the promise that "if the Provisional IRA were to cease its campaign of terror, the Ulster Volunteer Force would no longer deem it necessary to continue with their military operations". Privately the UVF were hugely pleased with the attack in a republican heartland and Billy Wright, leader of the Portadown unit of the UVF's Mid-Ulster Brigade, who was alleged to have been centrally involved, told Jim Cusack and Henry McDonald the killings were "one of things we did militarily in thirty years. We proved we could take the war to the Provos in one of their strongest areas". Cusack and McDonald asserted that a wealthy UVF supporter with a business in South Belfast helped the UVF purchase the cars used in the attack at auctions in the city.

Allegations
It was widely believed by nationalists and much of the media that the man who led the attack was Portadown UVF leader Billy Wright. According to investigative journalist Paul Larkin in his book A Very British Jihad: collusion, conspiracy and cover-up in Northern Ireland, a UVF volunteer who also participated in the Cappagh attack alleged that the other gunmen were forced to drag Wright into the car as he had become so frenzied once he had started shooting that he didn't want to stop. Wright was arrested by the Royal Ulster Constabulary (RUC) after the killings. During interrogation he told police he had been in Dungannon the evening of the attack. The RUC confirmed his alibi and he was released. Journalist Peter Taylor, on the other hand, said that he had been told by reliable UVF sources that Wright had not been involved at Cappagh. Whatever the truth of his involvement it was the Cappagh killings that propelled the still shadowy figure of "King Rat" into the popular media and his nickname soon became a by-word for UVF violence as a result of the attack.

The attack was a surprise to the IRA's East Tyrone Brigade as it was different from previous loyalist attacks. Thomas Mitchell suggested that it was the "most effective attack ever mounted by the loyalists against a republican target". Wright considered Cappagh to have been a successful UVF operation and took personal credit for "wiping them out". He discussed this in the Guardian newspaper:I genuinely believe that we were very successful, and that may sound morbid but they know that we hammered them into the ground and we didn't lose one volunteer. Indeed, members of the security forces had said that we done what they couldn't do, we put the East Tyrone brigade of the IRA on the run. It was the East Tyrone brigade which was carrying on the war in the North, including in Belfast. East Tyrone were decimated, the UVF wiped them out and that's not an idle boast.
When asked about the military importance of specific UVF operations, Wright replied, "I would look back and say that Cappagh was probably our best".

The shootings took place in an area that is strongly republican with a notable IRA tradition and presence; accordingly, the locals were suspicious of strangers or unusual activity. Moreover, the lack of roadblocks following the emergency call which had allowed the gunmen to flee in the getaway car through winding country backroads that were difficult to access and exit if one was not familiar with them led journalist Peter Taylor to allege that the UVF unit probably received help from the security forces. Taylor suggested that the Ulster Defence Regiment (UDR) was the authority in the best position to have known the exact movements of the IRA and to have passed-on the relevant information to the UVF hit squad. The RUC stated that a rifle-muzzle cover similar to those used by UDR soldiers was found at the scene and had underwent forensic examination.

In 2020 a Historical Enquiries Team report released by the Police Service of Northern Ireland (PSNI) revealed that intelligence had been received some time after the attack which named three serving UDR soldiers as responsible for the killings. The three soldiers named and two close associates (one of whom was also a UDR member) were arrested in December 1991 and questioned for several days about the Cappagh shootings and the murder of Sinn Féin member Tommy Casey near Cookstown in October 1990, before being released without charge. The arrests came from a joint investigation by the British Army and the RUC into security forces collusion in east Tyrone between 1988 and 1991. The RUC and British Army examination of intelligence relating to several murders and attempted murders between 1988 and 1991 "highlighted concerns in relation to several members of 8 UDR" - which covered parts of County Tyrone and had bases in Aughnacloy, Dungannon and Cookstown. The Historical Enquiries Team believed there were "probably four or five cases where UDR soldiers are linked to killings".

One of the vz. 58 assault rifles used in the attack, serial number R18837, was linked by the Historical Enquiries Team using forensic evidence or ballistic intelligence to as many as 12 murders and two attempted murders in eight separate different incidents in the east Tyrone and south Londonderry areas. The final victim of the weapon, 76-year-old Roseanne Mallon, was shot dead as she sat in a relative’s house near Dungannon in May 1994. The rifle was recovered nearby days later by the RUC. The rifle's stock had been removed and the letter 'T' and 'UVF' had been punched or drilled onto the rear plate. The Weapons and Explosives Research Centre, which was run by RUC Special Branch, had claimed the gun used to kill Roseanne Mallon had no known history; a coroner who presided at her inquest later said this claim was “entirely wrong”.

Wright shortly afterwards assumed command of the Mid-Ulster Brigade, taking over from Robin "The Jackal" Jackson, who had led the brigade since 1975. Wright formed the breakaway Loyalist Volunteer Force (LVF) in 1996, after he and his Portadown unit were stood down by the UVF Brigade Staff for breaking the group's ceasefire. He was shot dead in the Maze Prison on 27 December 1997 by three inmates, all of whom were members of the Irish National Liberation Army (INLA).

The Committee
Further allegations about the nature of the killing and the involvement of collusion were made in Sean McPhilemy's controversial book The Committee. According to Jim Sands, an Ulster Independence Movement activist and self-described member of the Ulster Loyalist Central Co-ordinating Committee who gave McPhilemy information about its activities, three car-loads of UVF members, including Wright, had travelled to Cappagh on the day of the shooting but had been directed there by a fourth car containing members of the RUC close to the committee. As a result of this escort, the cars were able to pass through two police checkpoints, one outside Pomeroy and the other outside Dungannon. Sands added that the attack had been planned hastily, based on intelligence that a meeting of the IRA's East Tyrone Brigade was taking place at the bar. Members of the RUC's "Inner Force", as Sands named those he claimed to be in league with the committee, had met with Wright in Dungannon and quickly drew up plans for the attack. Sands would later claim that ten UVF members had been involved in the attack and that this had constituted the entirety of the "Rat Pack", as Wright's hit team was known. He also added that Mid-Ulster Brigade commander Robin Jackson had been angry that the Rat Pack had not forced their way fully into the bar and killed all the patrons but according to Sands this was the hallmark of an Inner Force hit as they employed a quick in and quick out approach to avoid complications and minimise the possibility of witnesses.

In a subsequent interview carried out by journalist John Coulter with an anonymous figure who claimed to have been a member of the RUC Inner Force, the Committee member claimed that the main target of the raid on the bar had in fact not been killed in the attack. He did not reveal who this target had been.

Provisional IRA retaliation
The Provisional IRA initially did not acknowledge that three of the victims were within its ranks, apparently with the aim of garnering sympathy from the wider world (particularly in the Republic) towards nationalists in Northern Ireland.

The first reprisal took place on 9 April 1991, when alleged UVF member Derek Ferguson, a cousin of local MP Reverend William McCrea, was shot and killed in Coagh by members of the East Tyrone Brigade. His family denied any paramilitary links. In the months following the 1991 shootings, two former UDR soldiers were killed by the IRA near Cappagh. One of them was shot dead while driving along Altmore Road on 5 August 1991. The other former soldier was blown up by an IRA bomb planted inside his car at Kildress on 25 April 1993; it was claimed that he had loyalist paramilitary connections. The 1993 bombing led to allegations that the IRA was killing Protestant land-owners in Tyrone and Fermanagh in an orchestrated campaign to drive Protestants out of the region. There were at least five botched IRA attempts against the life of Billy Wright before the INLA succeeded in killing him in 1997 inside the Maze Prison.

1974 attack
This was not the first time the UVF carried out an attack on Boyle's Bar in Cappagh. On 17 January 1974 at around 19:40 two masked UVF gunmen entered the pub and opened fire indiscriminately on the customers with a Sterling submachine gun and a Smith & Wesson revolver, firing at least 35 shots. A Catholic civilian and retired farmer Daniel Hughes (73) was shot 11 times and killed in the attack and three other people were injured. A group calling itself the "Donaghmore-Pomeroy Battalion of the UVF" claimed responsibility for the shooting. The attack was linked to the notorious Glenanne gang.

See also

Timeline of Ulster Volunteer Force actions

References

Ulster Volunteer Force actions
The Troubles in County Tyrone
1991 crimes in the United Kingdom
1991 in Northern Ireland
20th century in County Tyrone
Conflicts in 1991
Mass murder in 1991
Deaths by firearm in Northern Ireland
Military actions and engagements during the Troubles (Northern Ireland)
March 1991 events in the United Kingdom